Robert Townley Caldwell (16 March 1843 – 8 September 1914) was the Master of Corpus Christi College, Cambridge from 1906 to 1914.

Biography
Born in Barbados on 16 March 1843, he was educated at St John's College, Winnipeg, King's College, London and Corpus Christi College, Cambridge, where he graduated B.A. as 10th wrangler in 1865. Elected a Fellow of Corpus Christi in 1865, he spent the rest of his working life there serving as  a Mathematical Lecturer, Bursar and finally Master until his death on 8 September 1914. He was also an active Cambridgeshire Freemason, from his initiation into Isaac Newton University Lodge rising to be Provincial Grand Master.

Notes

1843 births
University of Manitoba alumni
Alumni of King's College London
Fellows of Corpus Christi College, Cambridge
Masters of Corpus Christi College, Cambridge
1914 deaths
Barbadian emigrants to the United Kingdom
British Freemasons
Members of Isaac Newton University Lodge